The Mission Viejo Nadadores is one of the largest swimming and diving clubs in the United States. The team is located in Mission Viejo, California, training at the Marguerite Aquatic Center. The "Nadadores" were started in 1968 and have had athletes at every Olympics since 1976.  The team holds the record for winning the most team titles at the USA swimming Nationals, having won 48. The Dive Team has also won 48 National Championship and is the only team in history to sweep all 4 World Championships in one year.

At the 1984 Summer Olympics, Nadadores athletes won 13 medals (10 Gold). Notable alumni include: Brian Goodell, Shirley Babashoff, Mary T. Meagher, Robin Leamy, Greg Louganis, Michele Mitchell, Amy Shaw, Wendy Wyland, Jennifer Chandler, Wendy Williams (diver), Matt Scoggin, Megan Neyer, Ricardo Prado, Louise Messinger, Jesse Vassallo, Tiffany Cohen, Chloe Sutton, Dara Torres, Chad Carvin, Coach Mike O'Brien, Coach Mark Schubert, Coach Ron O'Brien, Coach Terry Stoddard, Coach Dr. Sammy Lee, Coach Jim Montrella, and 2008 US Olympic Open Water Coach Coach John Dussliere.  

Currently the Nadadores are led by American Swimming Coaches Association Hall of Fame member, Coach Bill Rose. Michele Mitchell is the High Performance Director and Head Coach of the Diving Team. At the 2004 Summer Olympic Games, Nadadore Larsen Jensen (American Record Holder) captured a Silver Medal in the Men's 1500 freestyle. 

In 2007, the oldest swimming world record was broken by Kate Ziegler in the 1500m freestyle at the TYR Swim Meet of Champions, which the team hosts annually.

References

External links
Team websites: swimming; diving.
City of Mission Viejo
American Swimming Coaches Association

Nadadores
Swim teams in the United States
Sports clubs established in 1968
1968 establishments in California